Cyperus iria (also known as rice flat sedge and rice flatsedge) is a smooth, tufted sedge found worldwide. The roots are yellowish-red and fibrous. The plant often grows in rice paddies, where it is considered to be a weed.

See also
 List of Cyperus species

References

External links
Cyperus iria occurrence data from GBIF

iria
Plants described in 1753
Taxa named by Carl Linnaeus